Jet Files is the second studio album by American rapper Curren$y. It was released digitally on October 6, 2009, while it was released physically on June 28, 2011, by Amalgam Digital.

Track listing

References

2009 albums
Currensy albums